The Civil Democratic Current (also called the Democratic Alliance for Civil Forces and the Democratic Civilian Alliance) is an alliance of political parties that would have run for the 2015 Egyptian parliamentary election, but it withdrew. The alliance is working with other parties, including the New Wafd Party, to attempt to amend the current parliamentary election law, which limits the number of party list seats to 120 of 567 total seats.

The alliance intends to form a "united national front" with more parties in preparation for the 2018 presidential election.

The alliance seems to be replaced by the similarly named Civil Democratic Movement (2017). The active alliance includes various parties that were also involved in this alliance;  namely, the Constitution Party, the Dignity Party, Socialist Popular Alliance Party, Egyptian Social Democratic Party and the Bread and Freedom Party.

Affiliated parties
Dignity Party
Constitution Party
Socialist Popular Alliance Party
Freedom Egypt Party
Popular Current Party
Bread and Freedom Party
Socialist Party of Egypt
Egyptian Social Democratic Party

References

2014 establishments in Egypt
Egyptian democracy movements
Left-wing political party alliances
Organizations established in 2014
Political opposition organizations
Political party alliances in Egypt
Secularism in Egypt